Stanisław Krystyn Zaremba (August 15, 1903, in Cracow – January 14, 1990, in Aberystwyth, Wales) was a Polish climber, mountaineer and mathematician. He was the son of Stanisław Zaremba (1863–1942), also a mathematician.

Zaremba is known for his contributions to low-discrepancy sequences, low-discrepancy sets of points, and their application to Quasi-Monte Carlo methods for numerical integration. He is one of the namesakes of the Hlawka–Zaremba formula in the theory of low-discrepancy sequences.

Education and career
Zaremba studied mathematics at the Jagiellonian University (1921-1924, 1926-1929) and in Paris (1924–26). After his studies he was an assistant at Vilnius University and since 1936 he was an associate professor at Jagiellonian University. He then worked as a lecturer in Stalinabad (nowadays Dushanbe in Tajikistan), England, Wales, United States and Canada, eventually settling in Wales, where he died in 1990. He visited Poland well into his old age, lecturing at the Jagiellonian University in 1981.

Mountaineering
Zaremba was an active climber in the years 1925-1927, especially during the winter. Its author is many first to enter the Tatra Mountains. The new roads he won first in the summer, among others. Little Kozi Wierch, Wieliczka Peak, Frog Turtle Muster, Mięguszowiecki Peak, Durny Peak. In winter he made his way to Hruby Wierch, Zadni Kościelec, Jaworowy Peak. Apart from the Tatras, he also climbed the Alps, the Pyrenees and the mountains of Lebanon, Iran, Wales and Tajikistan.

He was the editor of the magazine Taternik and an honorary member of the Polish Alpine Association.

One of the Wrocław's dwarfs (Alpinki group) is named Zarembek in his honor.

See also
Zaremba's conjecture

Selected publications

References 

Zofia, Witold Henryk Paryscy: Great encyclopaedia of Tatra, article "Zaremba, Stanislaw Krystyn"

20th-century Polish mathematicians